Rafters, later known as Jilly's, was a nightclub located in St. James Buildings, Oxford Street, Manchester, England. Some well-known bands played concerts at Rafters in the 1970s and 1980s.

Rob Gretton, who went on to become the manager of Joy Division, worked at Rafters. It featured in the 2007 film Control. The Depeche Mode albums An Futurist Night and A Second Now in Manchester were recorded at Rafters in 1981. A Second Now In Manchester was released on CD on Vertigo Records in 1990.

History
Rafters opened in Manchester in the 1970s in St James's Buildings in Oxford Street. The schedule generally remained the same: live gigs on Monday and Wednesday nights and a Folk night on Tuesday. By the mid-1970s the venue had become better known by the public and musicians, and leading musical bands began to play there. Following the rise of punk rock in 1976 and 1977, the venue became one of the main places in Manchester for live music. Joy Division performed there and in other Manchester venues such as Rock World.

Numerous new bands played in Rafters in 1977 among them Paul Young of Sad Café and Dougie James. At this time Rob Gretton was one of the DJs at the club and also became a leading figure in the Manchester punk scene. The Stiff Records Test (Chiswick Challenge) organised by Stiff Records took place here on 14 April 1978. The event proved significant in the history of the band Joy Division. Rob Gretton and Tony Wilson of Granada TV were present at the event and saw Joy Division play. Joy Division were the last of 17 bands to play, but made a strong impression on those at the concerts. As Rob Gretton commented:
 In 1978, the memorable DJ partnership of Colin Curtis and John Grant established the region's leading jazz-funk night at Rafters. The club closed in 1983. In its final years the DJ was Mike Shaft who appeared on Piccadilly Radio with Takin' Care of Business; though he resigned one night after being informed by the management that they felt that 'the club was becoming too black' for them. After that the club was renamed as Jilly's which existed to 1993, after which the club was called Music Box, the site of the Electric Chair club nights, which moved there from The Roadhouse in the late 90s and were hugely influential until they came to an end in 2008.

Concerts

Notes

References

External links
 

Nightclubs in Manchester